A Passion Play is the sixth studio album by British progressive rock band Jethro Tull, released in July 1973 in both the UK and US. Following in the same style as the band's previous album Thick as a Brick (1972), A Passion Play is a concept album comprising individual songs arranged into a single continuous piece of music (which was split into two parts across the original vinyl release's two sides). The album's concept follows the spiritual journey of a recently deceased man (Ronnie Pilgrim) in the afterlife, exploring themes of morality, religion and good and evil. The album's accompanying tour was considered the high water mark of Jethro Tull's elaborate stage productions, involving a full performance of the album accompanied by physical props, sketches and projected video.

A Passion Play was negatively received by critics upon its initial release. However, the album was a commercial success, becoming Jethro Tull's second number one album in the United States.

Background
Following the release of the critically and commercially successful Thick as a Brick in 1972, Jethro Tull made the decision to record their next album at the Château d'Hérouville studios in Hérouville, France, known in the 1970s for being frequented by artists such as Pink Floyd, Elton John and T. Rex. The band were persuaded by their management and accountants to record their next album in tax exile outside of the UK in order to avoid what Anderson described as "a pretty scary tax regime" of the time. The band planned to make a double album, with concepts as varied as the meaning of life, music criticism and the comparison between the man and animal world.

Upon arrival at the Château, however, the band faced a variety of challenges which made the recording sessions difficult, ranging from technical issues with the studio equipment to bug-infested beds and food poisoning epidemics, causing Anderson to give the Château the nickname "Château d'Isaster"  Although the band had recorded enough material to fill three sides of the intended double album, the issues living in the studio convinced the band to abandon the sessions and leave the Château. The band considered moving the album's production to Switzerland, for they had just recently been granted Swiss citizenship; however, the decision was ultimately made to return to the UK and completely restart writing and recording of the album (although two tracks from the Château d'Hérouville sessions were later included on the band's 1974 album War Child).

Recording
Upon returning to the UK, the band began sessions for A Passion Play at Morgan Studios, the same studio where they had recorded most of their last four albums. Anderson felt that "it was better to start again and write a whole new album, instead of trying to somehow regenerate everybody's interest and commitment to something that had already struggled", in reference to the abandoned Château sessions and the decision to start over with new material. The album was written and recorded quickly, as the band had little time before their next tour began. As a result, recording sessions were often lengthy, in some cases lasting all night. Guitarist Martin Barre recalled the sessions as being "long" and "very intense" with Anderson stating that the album needed to be "written and recorded in one block, very quickly". The concept and most of the music were written in the studio by Anderson, with occasional contributions from other members of the band.

Musical style
Continuing the progressive rock style previously explored by the band on Thick as a Brick, A Passion Play featured the band playing a multitude of instruments, heavily toned with dominating minor key variation, resulting in an album described by author Martin Webb as "quasi prog-rock with complex time-signatures, complex lyrics and, well, complex everything, really". The spoken word piece "The Story of the Hare Who Lost His Spectacles", has its relations in musical terms with Prokofiev’s Peter and the Wolf. Bruce Eder describes Anderson's singing in biblical-sounding references, interwoven with modern language as a sort of a rock equivalent to T.S. Eliot's The Waste Land with the music a "dazzling mix of old English folk and classical material, reshaped in electric rock terms". The album is notable for heavily featuring soprano saxophone played by Anderson, often in place of his famous flute playing. Anderson expressed distaste for the instrument, saying that "It wasn't difficult to learn to play it a bit, but I didn't practice enough, I wasn't trained and it hurt my lip. I hated the fiddling about with reeds, the fact that it was all wet and soggy, straight off I really didn't enjoy playing the instrument."

Concept

Background
A Passion Play borrows its title from passion plays which depict the Passion of Jesus Christ, though the title is evidently ironic, since the album at first appears to present a generically Christian view of the afterlife but then rejects Christian theological conclusions. A Passion Play is described in its album liner notes as though it were a staged theatrical "play" in four acts. Of this album, "the lyrics themselves are extremely complicated, the story is often unclear, and much is left to the individual's interpretation." Knowledge of the characters and setting actually comes less from the music itself and more from the few brief words in the satirical, six-page Linwell Theatre "programme" included in the original album packaging, which features photos of the band members listed alongside fake names and biographies as the "actors" of the play, and includes a cast and crew directory, including Rena Sanderone (an anagram of "Eean Anderrson") as the author of the play. A basic narrative plot can be loosely interpreted from the lyrics, liner notes, and "programme" of A Passion Play, centring on everyman protagonist Ronnie Pilgrim, who is named only in the programme.

Anderson described his conceptual inspiration for A Passion Play as "A fascination that I had about the possibility of a hereafter, that touches upon the conventions of popular religion, and Christianity in particular. It recognizes that age old conflict between good and bad, God and the Devil, and tries to bring it to some theatrical life, to give character, to give expression, to give... I suppose a sense of vulnerability and less than perfect sense regarding the identities of the personifications of good and evil. But basically it's a kind of slightly tongue-in-cheek look at what might happen when you die."

Plot synopsis
Ronnie Pilgrim recognises his own death and, in ghostly form, attends his own funeral, before traversing a purgatorial desert and "icy wastes", where he is visited by a smiling angel guide (Act 1). Pilgrim is next admitted into a video viewing room by a Peter Dejour, and events of Pilgrim's life are replayed by a projectionist before a demanding jury. After a long-winded and bizarre evaluation process, the sardonic jury concludes that they "won't cross [Pilgrim] out", suggesting that he has led a mostly decent life and so will be admitted into Heaven, which corresponds with the sudden start of a cheerful "Forest Dance" melody (Act 2).

At this time, the main plot is interrupted by an unrelated, spoken-word comedic interlude (narrated by Jeffrey Hammond with an exaggerated Lancashire accent) backed by instrumentation. Presented as an absurd fable, the interlude details (with much wordplay) the failure of a group of anthropomorphic animals to help a hare find his missing eyeglasses.

The "Forest Dance" melody resumes, and Ronnie Pilgrim now appears in Heaven, two days after his judgment at the viewing room, communicating two unexpected thoughts: "I'll go to the foot of our stairs" (an expression of surprise) and "pie in the sky" (an expression of scepticism about the fulfilment of a reward). Pilgrim's dissatisfaction with Heaven appears to be linked to its mundane atmosphere where most of its residents endlessly reminisce, chronically obsessing over the living. Therefore, unable to adapt, Pilgrim goes to G. Oddie & Son to frankly request a relocation to Hell, feeling that he has a "right to be wrong". Descending into Hell, Pilgrim is confronted by Lucifer (named "Lucy" in the album's fictitious programme), who asserts his cold authority as Pilgrim's "overseer" (Act 3). Pilgrim immediately finds Hell even worse than Heaven and flees, understanding himself now as neither completely good nor evil, wishing that he could trade his "halo for a horn and the horn for the hat I once had". He speaks with a Magus Perdé about his dilemma and, having sampled and rejected both extremes of his afterlife options, he finally stands on a Stygian shore as a "voyager into life". On this beach, other people and animals also prepare to "renew the pledge of life's long song". The final triumphant lyrics include the phrases "ever-burning fire", "ever-door", "ever-life", and moving "from the dark into ever-day", so that the play concludes with a strong implication of eternal rebirth (Act 4).

Reception

Upon its original release, it received generally negative reviews. Stephen Holden, writing for Rolling Stone, was broadly negative, saying that the album "strangles under the tonnage of its pretensions — a jumble of anarchic, childishly precocious gestures that are intellectually and emotionally faithless to any idea other than their own esoteric non-logic"; feeling, overall, that, despite the band being "truly virtuosic in the manner of a polished chamber ensemble" and some moments, such as "those interludes that feature Anderson’s extraordinary flute playing" and two "short pastoral sections" that were "especially lovely", the album was "expensive, tedious nonsense". New Musical Express considered the album as "the fall" of Jethro Tull. Even Chris Welch of Melody Maker had a bad impression, stating "Music must touch the soul. A Passion Play rattles with emptiness". Lester Bangs, writing for Creem Magazine, stated that he became "totally bamboozled" after hearing the album. Bangs concluded: "I almost like it, even though it sort of irritates me. Maybe I like it because it irritates me. But that's my problem".

Despite the reviews, A Passion Play sold well enough to reach No. 1 on the charts in the United States and Canada. The album also had good sales in Germany and Norway, where it reached No. 5. In the United Kingdom it reached No. 16. The 2013 box A Passion Play: an Extended Performance achieved the Nº 48 in the Top Rock Albums.

Legacy
Jethro Tull's business manager, Terry Ellis, announced in Melody Maker that the band would retire from live performances in response to negative reviews of the album and concerts. This was just a publicity stunt of which the band had no knowledge; Anderson felt it made them look petulant and brought them the wrong sort of publicity.

A three-star retrospective review by Bruce Eder for AllMusic was  gentle in its judgement, saying that "the music puts it over successfully, a dazzling mix of old English folk and classical material, reshaped in electric rock terms. The band is at its peak form, sustaining the tension and anticipation of this album-length piece across 45 minutes, although the music runs out of inspiration about five minutes before it actually ends". PopMatters ranked A Passion Play the 17th best progressive rock album of all time.

Paul Stump, in his History of Progressive Rock, said that "the writing is militantly episodic", with some beautiful moments but an overemphasis on novelty and an overall incoherent sequence of themes that makes the album bemusing and disorienting rather than engaging to the listener.

Some members of the band, in retrospect, expressed distaste for the album, including Anderson, saying that "I've always thought that A Passion Play suffered more than any other album I've ever made from being over-arranged and over-produced and over-cooked" and that Jethro Tull fans who call the album their favourite album of all time "should of course remain in the establishment for the criminally insane in which they probably already reside". Barre has said that he believes that the album exists in "the bottom third of Jethro Tull albums".

Releases
Subsequent to the original 1973 release, the album was released on CD. Later, in March 1998 Mobile Fidelity Sound Lab released a CD, which indexed tracks along the lines of, but not quite matching, the radio-station promo (see below) and in 2003 a remastered CD version with an additional video track was released.

On the original release of the album, side one ends in the middle of "The Story of the Hare Who Lost His Spectacles" (it is the same end on track 1 of the original CD release). The sound at the end of side one was a nod to children storytelling records which signalled the child or parent to flip the record over.  Side two begins where it left off. However, on the 2003 remastered CD, the second part begins with the full story so that it does not get cut off in the middle.

In 2014, commemorating the 40th anniversary (slightly belated) of the album, it was released a box called A Passion Play: An Extended Performance, which contains the complete Chateau d’Herouville sessions and brand-new mix by Steven Wilson. This version also includes an additional verse not on the original release of "The Foot Of Our Stairs". It extends the track about another 45 seconds. The DVDs also include the video clips of stage intro film and "The Hare Who Lost His Spectacles". The discs are packaged in a box set along with a book featuring interviews with Wilson, dancer Jane Eve, spun man Chris Amson, plus the memoirs of the Reverend Godfrey Pilchard.

Chateau D'Isaster recordings
Early concepts for the album were developed at the recording studio Château d'Hérouville, which the band, due to difficulties at the studio, playfully referred to as "Chateau D'Isaster". Previously unreleased recordings from these sessions were first offered to public under the title "The Chateau D'Isaster Tapes" on the 1988 compilation 20 Years of Jethro Tull (three recordings) and then in the 1993 compilation Nightcap: The Unreleased Masters 1973–1991. Nightcap included almost all the recordings with additional flute solos by Ian Anderson.

The full recordings were released in 2014, in the box A Passion Play: An Extended Performance. The box contains previously unreleased tracks such as "Sailor" and "The Big Top" along with the aforementioned "Skating Away" and "Critique Oblique".

Track listing
These titles were provided by Anderson for the 1973 DJ pressing of the LP, though they were not included for the standard pressing. The gold Ultradisc Original Master Recording CD of Mobile Fidelity Sound Lab (1998) contains cueable tracks for each title, but the standard CD releases contain only one or two tracks, depending on the version. The benefit of the latter, being an uninterrupted experience, with musical passages that crossfade.

All songs written by Anderson unless stated otherwise.

1973 original release

1998 Ultradisc Original Master Recording Gold CD (Mobile Fidelity Sound Lab UDCD 720)

2003 Remastered 30th Anniversary Edition

2014 An Extended Performance

Personnel
Jethro Tull
 Ian Anderson – lead vocals, flute, acoustic guitar, soprano and sopranino saxophone
 Martin Barre – electric guitar
 John Evan – backing vocals, piano, organ, synthesizer
 Jeffrey Hammond – bass guitar, spoken word (on "The Story of the Hare Who Lost His Spectacles")
 Barriemore Barlow – drums, percussion, timpani, glockenspiel, marimba

Additional personnel

 Dee Palmer – orchestral arrangements
 Robin Black – sound engineer
 Terry Ellis – producer
 Brian Ward – photography

Charts

Weekly charts

Year-end charts

Certifications

References

Sources

External links
 An excellent line-by-line annotated interpretation of the lyrics can be found at The Ministry of Information.
 A Passion Play at Ground and Sky [Dead Link]
 Smolko, Tim. Jethro Tull's Thick as a Brick and A Passion Play: Inside Two Long Songs. Bloomington: Indiana University Press, 2013. .
 Pat Kent: "An interview with the ballerina Jane Colthorpe" - The Jethro Tull Group. June 22, 2014
 Jethro Tull - A Passion Play (1973) album review by Bruce Eder, credits & releases at AllMusic.com
 Jethro Tull - A Passion Play (1973) album releases & credits at Discogs.com
 Jethro Tull - A Passion Play (1973) album review by vanderb0b at SputnikMusic.com
 Jethro Tull - A Passion Play (1973/2003 Remaster) album to be listened as stream at Play.Spotify.com
 Jethro Tull - A Passion Play (1973/2014 Steven Wilson Remix) album to be listened as stream at Play.Spotify.com
 Jethro Tull - A Passion Play (An Extended Performance with Chateau D’Herouville Sessions) (1973/2014 Steven Wilson Remix) album to be listened as stream at Play.Spotify.com

Jethro Tull (band) albums
Jethro Tull (band) songs
1973 albums
Concept albums
Chrysalis Records albums
Progressive rock albums by British artists
Reprise Records albums
Albums produced by Ian Anderson
Songs written by Ian Anderson
Albums recorded at Morgan Sound Studios